The Netherlands Aviation Safety Board was an agency of the Government of the Netherlands. It investigated aviation accidents and incidents. Its head office was located in Hoofddorp in the Haarlemmermeer municipality.

The Dutch Transport Safety Board, the successor agency, was established on 1 July 1999 and the Netherlands Aviation Safety Board was merged into the agency at that time.

Accidents investigated by the agency
 El Al Flight 1862
 KLM Cityhopper Flight 433

In addition it made commentary about:
 Tenerife disaster
 Martinair Flight 495

See also

 Dutch Safety Board (current agency)

References
 Garritsen, A.M. Pyttersen's nederlandse almanak. Bohn Stafleu Van Loghum, 1998.

Notes

Government agencies of the Netherlands
Organizations investigating aviation accidents and incidents
Haarlemmermeer
1999 disestablishments in the Netherlands
Aviation organisations based in the Netherlands
Defunct transport organisations based in the Netherlands